Brian MacLeod (born April 27, 1962) is an American recording drummer and songwriter. He has been a member of Group 87, Wire Train, Toy Matinee, and the "Tuesday Music Club" collective along with Sheryl Crow's acclaimed album Tuesday Night Music Club. MacLeod lives in Southern California.

Biography 
MacLeod grew up in Sunnyvale, California and attended Fremont High School from 1972 to 1976.

He is a member of The Scrantones, the group credited for performing the theme to the American version of the TV show The Office (set in Scranton, Pennsylvania).

He has performed with many other artists, including Madonna, Leonard Cohen, Tears For Fears, Seal, Chris Isaak, Melissa Etheridge, Pink, Christina Aguilera, Kevin Gilbert, Jewel, Stevie Nicks, Ziggy Marley, Tina Turner, Roger Waters, Rosanne Cash, Sara Bareilles, Brandi Carlile, The The, John Hiatt, & Grace Slick.

MacLeod's songwriting credits include: "Everyday Is a Winding Road", "Strong Enough", "A Change Would Do You Good", and "Shine Over Babylon" with Sheryl Crow; "Waiting for Love" with Pink; "Under a Cloud" with The Bangles & "Supermodel" from the film Clueless; "Queen of Compromise" with Tears for Fears.

Discography 
 1990 Toy Matinee, Toy Matinee
 1992 Roger Waters, Amused to Death
 1993 John Hiatt, Perfectly Good Guitar
 1993 Sheryl Crow, Tuesday Night Music Club
 1994 Katey Sagal, Well...
1995 Tears for Fears, Raoul and the Kings of Spain
 1996 Sheryl Crow, Sheryl Crow
 1998 Jewel, Spirit
 1999 Melissa Etheridge, Breakdown
 2000 Ronan Keating, Ronan
 2001 Shelby Lynne, Love, Shelby
 2001 Stevie Nicks, Trouble in Shangri-La
 2002 Sheryl Crow, C'mon, C'mon
 2002 Kaviar, The Kaviar Sessions (recorded in 1996)
 2003 Ziggy Marley, Dragonfly
 2003 Michelle Branch, Hotel Paper
 2004 Delta Goodrem, Mistaken Identity
 2004 Melissa Etheridge, Lucky
 2004 Anastacia, Anastacia
 2005 Sheryl Crow, Wildflower
 2005 Charlotte Church, Tissues and Issues
 2005 Brandi Carlile, Brandi Carlile
 2006 Ilse DeLange, The Great Escape
 2006 Skye Edwards, Mind How You Go
 2006 Rosanne Cash, Black Cadillac
 2007 Sara Bareilles, Little Voice
 2007 Carina Round, Slow Motion Addict
 2009 Chris Isaak, Mr. Lucky
 2014 Leonard Cohen, Popular Problems
 2014 Ziggy Marley, Fly Rasta
 2014 Adam Cohen, We Go Home
 2016 Ziggy Marley, Ziggy Marley
 2016 Leonard Cohen, You Want It Darker
 2018 Rita Coolidge, Safe in The Arms of Mine

References

Living people
American rock drummers
American session musicians
Songwriters from California
Musicians from Los Angeles
1962 births
The The members
Writers from Sunnyvale, California
20th-century American drummers
American male drummers
20th-century American male musicians
American male songwriters